Robert Wyatt (born 1945) is an English progressive rock musician

Robert Wyatt may also refer to:

 Robert B. Wyatt (born 1940), American book editor, fiction writer, and publisher
 Robert E. Wyatt, chemistry professor at University of Texas at Austin
 Bob Wyatt (1901–1995), English cricketer